This is a list of Honorary Fellows of St Cross College, Oxford.

 Hermione Lee
 Arthur Lionel Pugh Norrington

See also 

 :Category:Alumni of St Cross College, Oxford
 :Category:Fellows of St Cross College, Oxford

Honorary
Lists of Honorary Fellows of colleges of the University of Oxford